The Best Comeback Athlete ESPY Award has been presented annually since 1993 to the sportsperson, irrespective of gender, contesting a team sport professionally under the auspices of one of the four major professional sports leagues in the United States and Canada or an individual sport on either an amateur or professional basis primarily in the United States or internationally under the auspices of a sport governing body adjudged to have made the most significant, profound, or impressive comeback from serious illness, injury, personal or familial hardship, retirement, or significant loss of form.

Between 1993 and 2004, the award voting panel comprised variously fans; sportswriters and broadcasters, sports executives, and retired sportspersons, termed collectively experts; and ESPN personalities, but balloting thereafter has been exclusively by fans over the Internet from amongst choices selected by the ESPN Select Nominating Committee.

Through the 2001 iteration of the ESPY Awards, ceremonies were conducted in February of each year to honor achievements over the previous calendar year; awards presented thereafter are conferred in June and reflect performance from the June previous. The award wasn't awarded in 2020 or 2021 due to the COVID-19 pandemic.

List of winners

See also
ATP Comeback Player of the Year Award
Bill Masterton Memorial Trophy (National Hockey League)
MLB Comeback Player of the Year Award, The Sporting News Comeback Player of the Year Award
MLS Comeback Player of the Year Award
NFL Comeback Player of the Year Award
WTA Comeback Player of the Year Award

Notes

References

ESPY Awards